The Acciaioli, Acciaiuoli, Accioly, Acciajuoli or Acioli was an important family of Florence.

Family name is also written Acciaioli, Acciainoli, or Accioly, Accioli, Acioli and Acyoly in Portugal and Brazil, where there are branches of it. Descent can be traced in an unbroken line from one Gugliarello Acciaioli in the 12th century; family legend says that Gugliarello (a name possibly derived from It. guglia, needle) migrated from Brescia to Florence in 1160 because they were Guelphs and fled Barbarossa's invasion of Northern Italy. 

The Acciaioli founded a powerful bank in the 13th century (Compagna di Ser Leone degli Acciaioli e de' suoi consorti) which had branches from Greece to Western Europe until the bank collapsed in 1345. 

Bishop Angiolo Acciaioli briefly ruled Florence in the mid-14th century after the deposition of Gauthier de Brienne. Later they associated themselves to the Albizzi and then to the elder Medici in the 15th century. From about 1390 to 1460 they ruled the Duchy of Athens and kept close ties with the younger branch of the Medici through the marriage of Laudomia Acciaioli to Pierfrancesco de' Medici, from which the later Grand Dukes of Tuscany are descended, as well as several royal houses. In Florence, the Lungarno degli Acciaioli borders the Arno from the Ponte Vecchio to the Ponte Santa Trinita.

Simone di Zanobi Acciaioli migrated before 1512 to the island of Madeira where he represented the family's commercial interests. The Portuguese and Brazilian Accioly, Accioli or Acioli family is descended from him.

Family members
Angelo Acciaioli I (1298–1357), bishop
Angelo Acciaioli II (1349–1408), cardinal
Angelo Acciaioli di Cassano (died 1467), diplomat
Antonio I Acciaioli (died 1435), Duke of Athens
Antonio II Acciaioli (died 1445), Duke of Athens
Donato Acciaioli (1428–1478), scholar
Francesco I Acciaioli (floruit 1451–1453), Duke of Athens
Francesco II Acciaioli (died 1460), last Duke of Athens
Giovanni Acciaioli (floruit 1422), archbishop of Thebes
Nerio I Acciaioli (died 1394), first Acciaioli Duke of Athens
Nerio II Acciaioli (1416–1451), twice Duke of Athens
Niccolò Acciaioli (1310–1365), soldier and statesman
Zanobi Acciaioli (1461–1519), Dominican friar and scholar

See also
 Gran Tavola
 Bardi family
 Peruzzi
 House of Medici

References

Sources

 
Families of Florence
Banking families
Italian bankers
Medieval banking
Republic of Florence